Ray Herrmann (born September 3, 1960) is an American saxophonist & flutist from Chicago, Illinois, United States. He's currently the saxophonist for the band Chicago since taking over for the retired original saxophonist/flutist and group founder, Walter Parazaider, but filled in for Parazaider for over a decade on numerous tours going back to 2005.  Herrmann was promoted to an official member of Chicago in 2016.

Herrmann graduated from the University of North Texas. Before joining the band Chicago, Herrmann was a Los Angeles studio musician performing with Bob Dylan and Carlos Santana.

References

External links
Ray Herrmann's Website

Living people
American male saxophonists
American rock saxophonists
American Roman Catholics
Chicago (band) members
21st-century American saxophonists
21st-century clarinetists
21st-century American male musicians
1960 births